The Arctic Winter Games are a biennial multi-sport and indigenous cultural event involving circumpolar peoples residing in communities or countries bordering the Arctic Ocean.

Background
The Arctic Winter Games were founded in 1969 under the leadership of Governor Walter J. Hickel of Alaska, Stuart M. Hodgson, Commissioner of the Northwest Territories, and Yukon Commissioner James Smith. The idea to "provide a forum where athletes from the circumpolar North could compete on their own terms, on their own turf" came from Cal Miller, an advisor with the Yukon team at the 1967 Canada Winter Games.

In 1970 in Yellowknife, Canada, 500 athletes, trainers and officials came together for the first Arctic Winter Games. The participants came from the Northwest Territories, Yukon and Alaska. Since then, the Games have been held on fifteen occasions in different places and with ever more participants from more and more places within the Arctic region. The games in 2002 were the first jointly hosted Arctic Winter Games, by Nuuk, Greenland and Iqaluit, Nunavut.

Contingents
Since 2004 the same nine contingents have participated in the Arctic Winter Games. Another four contingents have taken part in the games throughout the games' history: Russia, Magadan, Tyumen and Chukotka. In the table below is an overview of each contingent's appearances throughout the games. Prior to the 2000 Arctic Winter Games Nunavut was part of the Northwest Territories. After division in 1999, Nunavut competed as separate contingent.

Host cities

Host cities have been in Canada, the United States, and Greenland.

Hodgson Trophy
The Hodgson trophy for fair play and team spirit is awarded at the end of every games. The trophy is named for Stuart Milton Hodgson, former Commissioner of the Northwest Territories.

The past winners of the trophy are:

Arctic Winter Games International Committee
The Arctic Winter Games International Committee consists of the following people
John Flynn - Yukon, President
John Rodda - Alaska, Vice President/Treasurer
Ian Laegraee - Northwest Territories, International Director
Leigh Goldie - Alberta, Secretary
Marie Cairns - Yukon, director
Karl Davidsen - Greenland, director
John Estle - Alaska, director
Gary Schauerte - Northwest Territories, director
Kyle Seely - Nunavut, director
Les Skinner - Northwest Territories, director
Don Wilson - Alberta, director
Moira Lassen - Yukon, Operations Coordinator
Lindsay Smith, Technical Coordinator

Sports disciplines
A total of 29 sports have been represented at the Arctic Winter Games. Arctic Sports, badminton, cross country skiing, ice hockey and volleyball are the only sports to be featured in all editions of the Arctic Winter Games.

The table below shows the sports and the years in which they have been a part of the Arctic Winter Games programme.

 = The sport was featured in this Arctic Winter Games.
 = The sport was featured in this Arctic Winter Games. The number indicates the amount of medal-giving events in that sport.
 = Demonstration sport with no medal-giving events.
 = The sport is planned to be a part of an upcoming edition of the Arctic Winter Games.
 = The sport did not feature in this edition of the Arctic Winter Games.

Arctic Winter Games alumni
 The Governor General of Canada, Michaëlle Jean, presented Aisa Pirti, a 19-year-old Inuk from Akulivik, Nunavik, with the National Aboriginal Role Model Award during a ceremony at Rideau Hall. Aisa has received 30 medals and five trophies for Inuit games in regional and circumpolar competitions, such as the Arctic Winter Games and the Eastern Arctic Summer Games.

See also
World Eskimo Indian Olympics
Nalukataq - traditional blanket toss celebrations

References

External links
Arctic Winter Games Official Website
Arctic Winter Games Archived Site

 
Winter multi-sport events
Sport in the Arctic
Multi-sport events in North America
Recurring sporting events established in 1970
First Nations sportspeople
Canadian Inuit sportspeople